East Pakistan Central Peace Committee, also known as the Nagorik Shanti Committee (Citizen's Peace Committee), or more commonly Peace Committee or Shanti Committee, was one of several committees formed in East Pakistan (present-day Bangladesh) in 1971 by the Pakistan Army to aid its efforts in crushing the struggle for Bangladesh's liberation. Nurul Amin, as a leader of Pakistan Democratic Party, led the formation of the Shanti Committee to thwart the Mukti Bahini who fought for the liberation of Bangladesh.

Background
On 25 March 1971, the liberation war began. On 4 April 1971, twelve pro-Pakistan leaders, including Nurul Amin, Ghulam Azam and Khwaja Khairuddin, met General Tikka Khan of the Pakistan Army and assured him of co-operation in opposing the Bangladesh rebellion. After subsequent meetings, they announced the formation of the Citizen Peace Committee, with 140 members. The first recruits included 96 Jamaat-e-Islami members, who started training in an Ansar camp at Khanjahan Ali Road, Khulna. The Shanti Committee is also alleged to have recruited Razakars.

History
The leaders of the East Pakistan Central Peace Committee called on citizens of Pakistan to defend Pakistan from "Indian aggression", as India was supporting the Bangladesh liberation movement. The Peace Committee organised a rally from Baitul Mukarram to Chawkbazar Mosque on 13 April. The rally was to end with a meeting near New Market. At the end of the rally, participants began rioting in Azimpur, Shantinagar and Shankhari Bazar areas. They set fire to the houses of known pro-liberation people and killed some.

The Peace Committee spread throughout East Pakistan, reaching even rural villages. Compared to the indiscriminate killing of Pakistan army the Peace committee were more specific and guided by lists they made of opponents. The Peace committee members were feared by the population of East Pakistan. Peace committee members were killed during Bangladesh Liberation War.

On 14 April, at a meeting in Dhaka, the Citizen Peace Committee renamed itself as the East Pakistan Central Peace Committee. A working committee was formed consisting of 21 members. They set up an office in Maghbazar. The Peace Committee appointed one or more liaison officers for the different police station areas of Dhaka. On 17 April 1971, the members of the peace committee apprised Governor Tikka Khan of the progress made by them toward restoring normalcy and confidence among the citizens. The central peace committee was being deputed to the district and divisional headquarters throughout east Pakistan. The peace committee in Munshiganj gave a grand reception to the West Pakistani militaries on 11 May 1971.

According to the historian Azadur Rahman Chandan in his 2011 book about the war, the Peace Committee was the first organisation to be set up by local residents who collaborated with Pakistan. Its members were drawn from the political parties of the Muslim League and Jamaat-e-Islami, which thought an independent Bangladesh was against Islam; as well as the Urdu-speaking Biharis.

Abolition
On 16 December 1971, after the end of the war, the committee was abolished.

Former members
 Khwaja Khairuddin - Leader of the East Pakistan Council Muslim League

See also
 Al Badr
 Al Sham

References

Bangladesh Liberation War
History of East Pakistan
1971 establishments in Bangladesh